Zhumabay Shayakhmetuly Shayakhmetov (Jūmabai Shaihmetūly Shaihmetov), (30 August 1902 – 17 October 1966), was a Kazakh Soviet Communist political figure.  From 1946 through 1954, he was First Secretary of the Communist Party of the Kazakh SSR. 

He was born to a poor peasant family in a small village in Borisov County (okrug), which in 1924 was incorporated as one of the nine rural areas in the Sherbakulsky District of the Omsk Oblast.  In 1915, he went to the two-year Kazakh-Russian school in what is now the Poltava Raion, graduating in 1917. He attended the Narimanov Institute in Moscow, but did not complete his first year.  In 1919, he got a job as a school teacher in a rural school, but the school closed due to the civil war, and he returned to his home.

From 1919 to 1926, Shayakhmetov was the secretary of the Turkoman Rural District executive committee of the GPU. By 1923, he was already a first-rate agent, solving crimes in the Cherlaksky District, Omsk Oblast. From 1926 to 1928, Shayakhmetov taught office management (official documentation) as the political instructor in a rural organization called "Koschi" in the Petropavl Okrug. From 1928 to 1938, he worked for the NKVD, first as Deputy Department Chief for the North Kazakhstan Oblast, then as the Deputy Department Chief for the Alma Ata Oblast.

From 1938 to 1946, Shayakhmetov worked his way up from Third Secretary to First Secretary of the Central Committee of the Communist Party of the Kazakh SSR. He was the first ethnic Kazakh to hold that post. In March 1954, Shayakhmetov was replaced as First Secretary by Panteleimon Kondratyevich Ponomarenko, a Russian, as part of Khrushchev's post-Stalin reorganization. For about a year, well into 1955, he was the First Secretary of the South Kazakhstan provincial committee of the Communist Party of Kazakhstan, before he was removed from that post as well.

He served as Chairman of the Soviet of Nationalities (1950–1954).

References

References
 Иванов, Евгений (30 August 2008) "Его забыли по личному приказу Хрущева" (Ivanov, Eugene (30 August 2008) "Forgotten by the personal order of Khrushchev") biography of Zhumabay Shayakhmetov in Russian
 "Жумабай Шаяхметов – основатель казахской советской партийной номенклатуры" (Ghali, Azimbaev (15 May 2002) "Zhumabay Shayahmetov – the founder of the Kazakh Soviet party structure) Интернет Гаӡета (Internet Gazette) in Russian
This article is based in part on material from the Russian Wikipedia.

1902 births
1966 deaths
People from Omsk Oblast
People from Akmolinsk Oblast (Russian Empire)
Ethnic Kazakh people
Central Committee of the Communist Party of the Soviet Union members 
First Secretaries of the Communist Party of Kazakhstan
Chairmen of the Soviet of Nationalities
First convocation members of the Soviet of the Union
Second convocation members of the Soviet of Nationalities
Third convocation members of the Soviet of Nationalities
Fourth convocation members of the Soviet of Nationalities
NKVD officers
Recipients of the Order of Lenin
Recipients of the Order of the Red Banner of Labour